Payette High School is a public high school in the western United States, located in Payette, Idaho. a former radar dome from the closed Baker Air Force Station in eastern Oregon; it was moved to PHS in the early 1970s.

Performing arts
Payette High School is the home of Pirate Theatre Company; it also offers several music classes: Choir, Guitar, Marching Band, Concert Band, and Jazz Band.

Notable alumni
 Harmon Killebrew - class of 1954 - Hall of Fame Major League Baseball player (1959–75)
 Jim McClure - class of 1942 - U.S. Senator (1973–91), U.S. House (1967–73)
 Sting Ray Robb - class of 2019 - racing driver

References

External links
Payette High School
Payette School District #371
Radomes.org – Baker Air Force Station

Public high schools in Idaho
Schools in Payette County, Idaho